The 1915 Australasian Championships was a tennis tournament that took place on outdoor Grass courts at the Auchenflower, Brisbane, Australia from 13 August January to 21 August. It was the 11th edition of the Australian Championships (now known as the Australian Open), the 2nd held in Brisbane, and the first Grand Slam tournament of the year. The men's singles title was won by Gordon Lowe.

Finals

Singles

 Gordon Lowe defeated  Horace Rice 4–6, 6–1, 6–1, 6–4

Doubles
 Horace Rice /  Clarence Todd defeated  Gordon Lowe /  Bert St John, 8–6, 6–4, 7–9, 6–3

References

External links
 Australian Open official Website

 
1915 in Australian tennis
1915
August 1915 sports events